Whitcomb is an unincorporated community in Brookville Township, Franklin County, Indiana.

History
Whitcomb was originally called Union, and under the latter name was platted in 1816 by Ebenezer Howe. A post office was established at Whitcomb in 1846, and remained in operation until it was discontinued in 1906.

Geography

References

Unincorporated communities in Franklin County, Indiana
Unincorporated communities in Indiana